William Lilly (June 3, 1821 – December 1, 1893) was a Republican member of the U.S. House of Representatives from Pennsylvania.

William Lilly was born in Penn Yan, New York.  He moved to Carbon County, Pennsylvania, in 1838, and became involved in the mining of anthracite coal.  He was elected colonel of one of the militia regiments of the Lehigh Valley and subsequently became brigadier general.  He was a Democratic member of the Pennsylvania State House of Representatives in 1850 and 1851.  In 1862 he affiliated with the Republican Party, and was a delegate to six Republican National Conventions.  He was a delegate at large to the convention to revise the constitution of Pennsylvania in 1872 and 1873.

Lilly was elected as a Republican to the Fifty-third Congress and served  until his death in Mauch Chunk, Pennsylvania.  Interment in the City Cemetery.

See also
List of United States Congress members who died in office (1790–1899)

Sources

The Political Graveyard

1821 births
1893 deaths
Republican Party members of the United States House of Representatives from Pennsylvania
Pennsylvania Democrats
19th-century American politicians